Bernard Lamitié (born 27 June 1946 in Paris) is a retired French triple jumper and Olympian who won three bronze medals at the European Indoor Championships.

Achievements

References

European Indoor Championships

1946 births
Living people
French male triple jumpers
French people of Guadeloupean descent
Athletes from Paris
Athletes (track and field) at the 1972 Summer Olympics
Athletes (track and field) at the 1976 Summer Olympics
Olympic athletes of France
Mediterranean Games gold medalists for France
Mediterranean Games medalists in athletics
Athletes (track and field) at the 1975 Mediterranean Games
Athletes (track and field) at the 1979 Mediterranean Games